Marinobacter daqiaonensis is a Gram-negative and moderately halophilic bacterium from the genus of Marinobacter which has been isolated from sediments of the Daqiao saltern in Qingdao.

References

Further reading 
 

Alteromonadales
Bacteria described in 2011
Halophiles